Madura is a small roadhouse community located on the Eyre Highway in Western Australia, on the Roe Plains. It is at the foot of the escarpment next to the Madura Pass down from the Nullarbor Plain. UTC+8:45 is the local time zone in use.

History
Madura was settled in 1876 as a place to breed quality cavalry horses for the British Indian Army for use in the Northwest Frontier region of India (now part of Pakistan). The horses were shipped from the coast at Eucla. (Cervantes, north of Perth, was also used for breeding.) The site was chosen as it was one of the few with free flowing bore water in the area.

The surrounding area is part of Madura Station, currently a sheep station, but previously used to graze cattle, horses and camels.

Present day

Like other locations in the Nullarbor Plain area, the area consists of little more than a roadhouse, open 06:00 to 21:00 each day.

Two kilometres west of Madura is a scenic lookout with sweeping views of the Madura Pass across the escarpment and the Roe Plains. Natural blowholes may also be found nearby. The area is used for pastoral purposes, mainly sheep rearing.

Surrounding Madura is the Madura Shelf,  of predominantly sedimentary rock, part of the Bight Basin, which has been found to contain crude oil and geothermal gradients.

References

Further reading
 Main Roads, Western Australia (2006) Distance book: distances to towns and localities in Western Australia East Perth, W.A. Main Roads

External links

Shire of Dundas – Towns of the Eyre Highway
Nullarbor Net – Madura including local information.

Towns in Western Australia
Shire of Dundas
Nullarbor Plain
Roadhouses in Western Australia
Eyre Highway
Hampton bioregion